Zwickl is a surname. Notable people with the surname include:

Dániel Zwickl (born 1984), Hungarian table tennis player
 (born 1939), Austrian journalist
Kurt Zwickl (1949–2021), American politician

See also
 Zwick